Sweden selected their Junior Eurovision Song Contest 2014 entry through Lilla Melodifestivalen 2014 which consisted of eight songs. The final was held on 6 June 2014 at the Gröna Lund amusement park in Stockholm. Julia Kedhammar, with her song "Du är inte ensam", was chosen as the winner.

Lilla Melodifestivalen 2014

Final

At Junior Eurovision 
At the running order draw which took place on 9 November 2014, Sweden was drawn to perform seventh on 15 November 2014, following  and preceding .

Voting

Detailed voting results
The following members comprised the Swedish jury:
 Daniel Réhn
 Gustav Dahlander
 Mirja Bokholm
 Marie Olofsson
 Samuel Andersson

Notes

References

Junior Eurovision Song Contest
Sweden
2014